Lars Emil Tobias Zilliacus (born 30 September 1971) is a Swedish-speaking Finnish actor. He is best known of his role in the 2012 Swedish crime film The Hypnotist. In 2015, Zilliacus appeared in British TV series Fortitude.

Filmography

References

External links

1971 births
Living people
Male actors from Helsinki
Swedish-speaking Finns
Finnish male film actors